Edward Simpson (March 3, 1824 – December 1, 1888) served as an officer in the United States Navy during the Mexican–American War and the American Civil War, eventually attaining the rank of rear admiral. His service included being assigned as commanding officer of several Navy ships and serving with distinction in various shore assignments.

Early life
Edward Simpson was born on March 3, 1824, in New York City, to parents Edmund and Elizabeth (Jones) Simpson, both actors.

U.S. Navy career
Simpson was appointed midshipman in the United States Navy in February 1840, shortly before his sixteenth birthday. He served afloat until late 1845, when he became a member of the first class of midshipmen to be trained at the new United States Naval Academy in Annapolis, Maryland.

Pre-Civil War service
After graduation on July 9, 1846, Simpson reported to USS Vixen and participated in numerous bombardments during the Mexican–American War.

During the next 15 years, he served afloat in the Brazil Squadron and the China Squadron and with the U.S. Coast Survey, and ashore in two tours at the U.S. Naval Academy: first as gunnery instructor, then in 1860 as head of the department of ordnance and gunnery.

Civil War service
In May 1861, shortly after the outbreak of the American Civil War, Simpson moved with the Naval Academy to Newport, Rhode Island, where it was relocated for the duration of the war. In 1862 he became Commandant of Midshipmen.

In June 1863 he took command of the monitor, USS Passaic. He participated in bombardments at Charleston, South Carolina, from July to November 1863. From July to December 1864, he commanded Isonomia in the East Gulf Blockading Squadron; and, then served from February to April 1865 as Fleet Captain of the West Gulf Blockading Squadron and of the forces attacking Mobile, Alabama.

Post-war activity
After the war, he alternated tours of command ashore and afloat with tours of ordnance duty, including a mission to Europe in 1870–72, and command of the Naval Torpedo Station in 1873 and again from 1874 to 1875. As of 1880, he was the officer in charge of the naval station in New London, Connecticut. In 1883, he was appointed president of a board to select a site for a government gun factory and made another study trip to Europe.

Promoted to rear admiral on February 9, 1884, he served as president of the Naval Advisory Board and president of the Board of Inspection and Survey until his retirement on March 3, 1886.

Post-Navy career
Rear Admiral Simpson died in Washington, D.C., December 1, 1888, and was buried in Cypress Hills Cemetery. The destroyer USS Simpson (DD-221), commissioned on November 3, 1920, was named in his honor.  His son, Edward Simpson Jr., also became a rear admiral, and his daughter Ruth married Rear Admiral Charles Mitchell Thomas.

Promotions
 Midshipman – February 11, 1840
 Passed midshipman – July 11, 1846
 Master – July 10, 1854
 Lieutenant – April 18, 1855
 Lieutenant commander – July 16, 1862
 Commander – March 3, 1865
 Captain – August 15, 1870
 Commodore – April 26, 1878
 Rear admiral – February 9, 1884
 Retired list – March 3, 1886

See also

 Mexican–American War
 American Civil War
 Board of Inspection and Survey

References

1824 births
1888 deaths
United States Naval Academy alumni
Union Navy officers
United States Navy personnel of the Mexican–American War
United States Navy admirals
Military personnel from New York City
People of New York (state) in the American Civil War